Brown Canyon Ranch, formerly known as the Barchas Ranch, is a historic ranch located in the foothills of the Huachuca Mountains, near Sierra Vista, Arizona.

History
The land Brown Canyon Ranch is on was first settled around 1880 by John Thomas Brown, who owned a hotel a few miles away in neighboring Ramsey Canyon. Following a succession of owners, the land eventually ended up in the hands of the brothers James and Tom Haverty. Between 1905 and 1907, James and his brother built what is today the most prominent building in the canyon, a modest three-room adobe home, now known as the Brown Canyon Ranch House. James and his wife Lessie homesteaded the ranch in 1912 and lived there until 1921, when it was sold to William and Margaret Carmichael.

The Carmichaels were major landowners in the Sierra Vista area and did not take up residence at the house. Instead, they rented it out to a local miner named Harvey James and later a Yaqui Indian named Chico Romero and his family. In 1946, the Carmichaels sold the ranch to Roy and Stella Rambo, who raised cattle on it until 1957, when it was again sold to Samuel and Cecile Barchas. The Barchas family did not live on the ranch, either, but they raised livestock on it all the way up until 1997. One year later it was deeded to the United States Forest Service in a land exchange.

Efforts to preserve and restore the historic ranch house, as well as its associated outbuildings, has been underway since 1998. In addition to the ranch house, there is also a one-room adobe storeroom adjacent to the house, a wooden corral and outhouse, the stone ruins of a barn, and a pair of man-made ponds, which are now used as a preserve for the endangered Chiricahua leopard frog. Further up the trail is a small graveyard known as the Brown Canyon Cemetery, followed by the ruins of an old house and the remains of the Pomono Mine. The ranch is open to hikers and picnickers, free of charge, for day use only.

Buildings and remnants
There are several historic buildings and other remnants at the Brown Canyon Ranch, including the following:
 Ranch House: Adobe "L" shaped building with a tin hipped roof, including a main living room, a kitchen in the center, and a bedroom
 Storeroom: One-room adobe building with a tin roof, adjacent to the bedroom of the ranch house
 Barn: Stone building in ruins
 Outhouse: Attached to the corral
 Corral: Wooden structure
 Windmill: Attached to a small water tank, now used as a preserve for the Chircahua leopard frog
 Frog ponds: Two man-made ponds now used as a preserve for the Chiricahua leopard frog
 Old house: Ruins up the trail from the ranch house
 Brown Canyon Cemetery: A small graveyard near the ruins of the old house
 Pomono Mine: former mining operation from the early 20th century

Photo gallery

See also

 Little Boquillas Ranch
 Faraway Ranch Historic District
 San Bernardino Ranch
 San Rafael Ranch
 Empire Ranch

References

Ranches in Arizona
Houses completed in 1907
1907 establishments in Arizona Territory
Buildings and structures in Cochise County, Arizona
History of Cochise County, Arizona
Tourist attractions in Cochise County, Arizona